A list of British films released in 1999.

1999

See also
 1999 in film
 1999 in British music
 1999 in British radio
 1999 in British television
 1999 in the United Kingdom
 List of 1999 box office number-one films in the United Kingdom

References

External links

1999
Films
Lists of 1999 films by country or language